Dr. Heidenhoff's Process is an early novel by American author Edward Bellamy.  The book was first published by D. Appleton & Company in 1880.

Plot introduction
The novel concerns a doctor who develops a mechanical method of eradicating painful memories from people's brains so that they can feel good about life again.  The protagonist persuades his lover to try the process after she has been seduced by a rival.  She is transformed until the protagonist awakes and realizes that he has dreamt of the doctor and his process and that his lover has committed suicide.

References

External links

 Dr. Heidenhoff's Process, available at Wikisource
 

1880 American novels
D. Appleton & Company books